Baz-e Heydar (also Romanized as Bāz-e Ḩeydar; also known as Bār-e Ḩeydar) is a village in Zeberkhan Rural District, Zeberkhan District, Nishapur County, Razavi Khorasan Province, Iran. At the 2006 census, its population was 109, in 35 families.

References 

Populated places in Nishapur County